Mammalian-wide interspersed repeats (MIRs) are transposable elements in the genomes of some organisms and belong to the group of Short interspersed nuclear elements  (SINEs).

Incidence 
MIRs are found in all mammals (including marsupials).

In human 
It is estimated that there are around 368,000 MIRs in the human genome.

Structure 
The MIR consensus sequence is 260 basepairs long and has an A/T-rich 3' end.

Propagation 
Like other Short interspersed nuclear elements  (SINEs), MIR elements used the machinery of LINE elements for their propagation in the genome, which took place around 130 million years ago. They cannot retrotranspose anymore since the loss of activity of the required reverse transcriptase.

History of discovery 

MIR elements have been first described in human genome 1989-1991  
and were first referred as MB1 family repeats (mirror to sequences of mouse B1 repeat). Then this family repeats were found in other mammalian genomes.  Then this family was renamed as "Mammalian interspersed repeats" in 1992  Later this family was shown to be common for vertebrate genomes.

References

Mobile genetic elements
Molecular biology